A kapo was a privileged prisoner who served as a barracks supervisor/warder or led work details in a Nazi concentration camp.

Kapo may also refer to one of the following:

 Kapo (1960 film), an Italian film about the Holocaust
 Kapo (2000 film), an Israeli documentary about Jewish kapos who collaborated with the Nazis during World War II
 Kapo (mythology), a Hawaiian goddess or god
 Kapo!, a studio album by the neo-folk band Death In June
 Kazan Aircraft Production Association, a Russian aircraft manufacturer
 KAPO or KaPo, an acronym for Kaitsepolitsei, the state security agency of Estonia
 KAPO (abbreviated from ), Swiss cantonal police
 Mallica Reynolds (1911–1989), a Jamaican artist that went by the name Kapo
 Olivier Kapo (born 1980), a retired French footballer
 Hysni Kapo, an Albanian military commander and leading member of the Party of Labour of Albania

See also
 Capo (disambiguation)
 Kapow (disambiguation)